Krishnananda Dutta  born as Krishnananda Dutta Chowdhury (Bengali: কৃষ্ণানন্দ দত্তচৌধুরী, Odiya: କ୍ରିଷ୍ଣାନନ୍ଦ ଦତ୍ତ ଚୌଧୁରୀ and कृष्णानंद दत्तचौधुरी in Devanagari, Phonetic transcription: Krishnananda Dutta Chowdhury) (c. 1490-1570) born into a Dutta Chowdhury family in Andul of the present-day Howrah district of West Bengal, India and was the 4th Chowdhury revenue collector (zamindar) there. He was a devotee of Krishna from a very early age. He followed the precepts of a true Vaishnava, affectionate and enduring to one and all. He regularly organised kirtans at his kirtanana-mandapa located near by his home.

In ca.1514 CE Krishnananda was initiated to krsna-nama-mantra by Nityananda Prabhu in Andul. A few years later, by giving all the responsibilities of the family estate to his younger son Kandarparam Dutta, Krishnananda took sanyas and went to Puri, caring his celebrated deities— Radha-Madhava there. With the request of the king of Aul he further moved to Chhoti village located at Kendrapara district in Odisha.

He was a distant ancestor of Kedar Nath Dutta (Srila Bhakti Vinoda Thakura) and Bimala Prasad Dutta (Shrila Bhakti Shiddhanta Saraswati Thakura). The deities which Krishnananda carried to Puri from Andul are now known as the 'Ancestral deities of Bhakti Vinod Thakur'.

References 

16th-century Indian people
Bengali Hindus